Retro (stylized as RETЯO) is a KMFDM compilation album featuring a sampling of the band's more popular songs. It was initially released in 1996 as a promotional item, and released for sale to the public in 1998.

Track listing

References

KMFDM compilation albums
1996 compilation albums